Daniel Chun is a Korean American comedy writer. He has written for The Office and The Simpsons. He received a Writers Guild Award nomination and an Annie Award for his work on The Simpsons. He was once head writer and an executive producer of The Office, receiving two Emmy nominations for his work on the show. Chun has also contributed to the Harvard Lampoon, TNR.com, 02138 Magazine, New York Magazine, The Huffington Post, and Vitals magazine, where he wrote the back page column. He wrote for the ABC comedy series Happy Endings, joining the show as a writer and producer in season three. In 2015, his ABC Studios pilot Grandfathered, starring John Stamos, was ordered to series on Fox.

Chun studied biological anthropology at Harvard University.

He was named one of Variety's 10 TV Scribes To Watch in 2015.

In 2019, Chun joined several WGA writers in firing their agents as part of the WGA's stand against the ATA and the practice of packaging.

The Simpsons episodes
"Marge's Son Poisoning" (2005)
"Jazzy and the Pussycats" (2006)
"G.I. (Annoyed Grunt)" (2006)
"Rome-old and Juli-eh" (2007)
"Any Given Sundance" (2008)
"Treehouse of Horror XX" (2009)

The Office episodes
"Murder" (2009)
"The Delivery" (2010)
"Nepotism" (2010)
"Training Day" (2011)
"Doomsday" (2011)
"Tallahassee" (2012)

References

External links

The Harvard Lampoon alumni
American writers of Korean descent
Living people
People from Monroe County, Pennsylvania
Writers from Pennsylvania
Annie Award winners
Television producers from Pennsylvania
American television writers
American male television writers
Year of birth missing (living people)